The oud is a musical instrument.

Oud or OUD may also refer to:

 Agarwood, a perfume or incense material
 OUD, a registered trademark of the Orthodox Union for identifying kosher products that contain dairy
 Oxford Universal Dictionary, American name for an edition of the Shorter Oxford English Dictionary
 Opioid use disorder
 Angads Airport, by IATA code
 Jacobus Oud (1890–1963), Dutch architect
 Pieter Oud (1886–1964), Dutch politician

See also  
 Oude or Oudh, historical name for the Awadh region in India
 OOD (disambiguation)